Wilstone is the name of an English village and a reservoir approximately two miles north-west of Tring, Hertfordshire. The village lies within the civil parish of Tring Rural, close to the boundary with Buckinghamshire.

Wilstone reservoir, one of the four Tring reservoirs, lies close to the village.

History 
It is believed by historians that Wilstone began under the name of Wyvellsthorn somewhere around the 6th century but there is evidence that the area had been settled long before then as a Roman coin with the face of Publius Metilius Nepos, a Roman Governor of Britain from AD96 to AD98, has been found in the village and ancient pottery has been found near the reservoir.

Wilstone has mostly remained the same over the past couple of centuries. Before the construction of the Grand Union Canal and Tring reservoirs Wilstone consisted mostly of a marsh in the south called  'the moors' and mills in the northern part of the village known as the milloppers. After the Moors drained into the Canals and reservoirs new land for workers to live became available and up to four pubs or ale houses, a chapel, a church, two or three shops, a forge and all the trades needed to support a village were constructed, however the only one of these 18th century developments to remain in its past form is The Half Moon, the local pub and the St. Cross church as the rest have been turned into houses because the invention of the automobile has made it possible for the villagers to travel to the surrounding towns for their services instead of using the shops inside the village.

In 1861 the village's population was recorded as around 455 however when a depression caused by international food trade and outbreaks of disease amongst workers hit the British agricultural industry the population declined. The village suffered heavily as workers' conditions worsened and wages lowered further. This degradation of conditions caused the village's population to drop to 400 as the workers moved to the city for a better life.

The Witches Trial 
In 1751 a horrific witch hunt took place in Wilstone and the surrounding villages. The series of events began in Gubblecote when an elderly couple from Long Marston were begging for money. After being turned away the mutterings of the women were mistaken for a curse and soon after the farmer fell ill and the two were believed to be a Wizard and a Witch. On 14 April a notice was posted in Leighton Buzzard, Hemel Hempstead and Winslow markets which read:

As time went on the people grew more hostile towards the Couple forcing them to flee to the Tring Workhouse for their own safety however this proved futile as a massive crowd possibly numbering around 4000 carried the couple away to Wilstone where they were dunked in a pond until death.

The perpetrator named Colley, who had collected money from the mob because of the "enjoyment the ducking had provided", later paid for his actions as he was arrested, tried in Hertford then hung by chains in the Wilstone Green.

Education 
In 1838, the second year of Queen Victoria's reign, an act was passed to prompt the construction of more schools across England. Wilstone was selected as one of these locations and in 1848 the new school opened. The school was made up of one block and over its lifespan saw very few changes, the greatest change to the school being the transformation of the mud patch of a playground into a proper turfed area with an iron fence. The school saw 1,394 students cross its threshold with the students first entering the school when they were two years old and leaving when they were 12 years of age.

During World War I and World War II the school did its best to chip in and support the war efforts. In 1914-1918 the students collected 250 lbs of blackberries to add to the rations, In 1940 the school was pushed to maximum capacity as evacuees flooded the countryside from the cities under attack from the Luftwaffe and in 1948 the school was taken over by the Hertfordshire County Council from the Church of England and in 1956 school lunches were discontinued making the school into one of the very few in which students went home for lunch. In 1971 the school met its fate when it was shut down in favour of the modern school in Long Marston. The site remained empty until 1974 when it was turned into a block of flats.

Religion 
Wilstone has had a wide array of places of worship over the ages. The earliest acknowledgement of a chapel in Wilstone is an extract from a will which donates Four shillings and sixpence to the priest singing mass. This chapel was destroyed in Cromwell times when the structure was torn down and the materials were distributed to repair the villagers' houses.

The village lacked a chapel until 1837 when the Grange family erected a Baptist Chapel on New Road which has now been converted into semi-detached houses

St. Cross 
In 1876 Wilstones new church started construction, possibly this was the first church in Wilstone in well over a century. Other than an extension in 2000 that added a new wheelchair access ramp and entrance this Church has remained unchanging over the past 141 years.

It holds around 2-3 services each month and hosts a bustling coffee morning between 10.30am and 12.00pm. The Church welcomes visitors and there is Tea and Coffee available. The "St" in St Cross translates to Sanctus which means that the church's name is "The Church of the Holy Cross".

References

External links

Villages in Hertfordshire